Chanderi sari is a traditional sari made in Chanderi, Madhya Pradesh, India.

History

The weaving culture of Chanderi emerged between the 2nd and 7th centuries. It is situated on the boundary of two cultural regions of the state, Malwa and Bundelkhand. The people of the Vindhyachal Ranges have a wide range of traditions. In the 11th century the trade locations Malwa, Medwa, central India and south Gujarat increased the region's importance.

The Chanderi sari tradition began in the 13th century. Around 1350, Koshti weavers from Jhansi migrated to Chanderi and settled there. During the Mughal period, the textile business of Chanderi reached its peak.

Themes and motifs 
Chanderi saris are produced from three kinds of fabric: pure silk, Chanderi cotton and silk cotton. Traditional coin, floral art, peacocks and modern geometric designs are woven into different Chanderi patterns. The saris are among the finest in India and are known for their gold and silver brocade or zari, fine silk, and opulent embroidery.

See also 
Surel
Banarasi sari
Ilkal saree
Mysore silk

References 

Saris
Culture of Madhya Pradesh
Ashoknagar district
Geographical indications in Madhya Pradesh